Héctor Alonso Rebaque (born 5 February 1956) is a Mexican former racing driver who raced in Formula One and CART IndyCar in the 1970s and 1980s. He also ran for his own Formula One team called Rebaque in 1978 and 1979.

Racing career
Rebaque participated in 58 Formula One World Championship Grands Prix, debuting on 1977 Belgian Grand Prix, the first participation of a Mexican driver in the category since the death of Pedro Rodríguez in a Interserie's race in Norisring in 1971.  He scored a total of 13 championship points.  He also ran his own Formula One team, Rebaque, in 1978 and 1979; usually he raced Lotuses but for the last three races in 1979 he fielded his own car designed by Penske which he called the HR100.

He also drove in the 1982 CART IndyCar season for Forsythe Racing including the 1982 Indianapolis 500 where he finished 13th after a pit fire on lap 151. He won his final CART race, which was the first one held at Road America. However, he was injured a week later in a testing crash at Michigan International Speedway.  From there he decided to return to road racing as he felt oval racing was too dangerous.

His final race was the 1983 Race of Champions, a Formula One non-points race at Brands Hatch.

Helmet
Rebaque's helmet was black with a green, white and red design surrounding the visor area. The colours used are the colours of the Mexican flag.

Business
After his retirement from racing track, Rebaque now works in architecture related businesses in Mexico.

Racing record

Career summary

Complete 24 Hours of Le Mans Results

Complete European Formula Two Championship results
(key) (Races in bold indicate pole position; races in italics indicate fastest lap)

Complete Formula One World Championship results
(key) (Races in bold indicate pole position; races in italics indicate fastest lap)

American open-wheel racing
(key) (Races in bold indicate pole position)

CART PPG Indy Car World Series

Indianapolis 500

References

Bibliography
Héctor Alonso Rebaque – El ùltimo amateur de la F1 , Carlos Eduardo Jalife Villalon, Scuderia Hermanos Rodriguez, 2010 ISBN .

1956 births
Living people
Mexican racing drivers
Mexican Formula One drivers
Hesketh Formula One drivers
Rebaque Formula One drivers
Brabham Formula One drivers
Formula One team owners
European Formula Two Championship drivers
Indianapolis 500 drivers
Champ Car drivers
Atlantic Championship drivers
Racing drivers from Mexico City
Mexican expatriates in the United Kingdom
Mexican Indianapolis 500 drivers
24 Hours of Le Mans drivers
Forsythe Racing drivers
Ecurie Ecosse drivers